Danmarks Næste Topmodel, cycle 1 was the first Danish adaptation of Tyra Banks' America's Next Top Model. The show was hosted by Caroline Fleming with thirteen contestants competing for the title of Denmark's Next Top Model.

Among the prizes was a modeling contract with Unique Models, a two-week all-expenses paid trip to Paris along with a test shoot for Ford Models, appeared on the cover and a ten-page spread in Elle Magazine denmark, and the chance to become the face of L'Oreal Paris.

The winner of the competition was Caroline Bader from Nærum. At fifteen years old, Bader was the youngest winner of the Top Model franchise at the time of her victory, and remained with that status until the following year, when Laura Giurcanu became the youngest Top Model winner after winning the second cycle of the Romanian adaptation at the age of 14.

Contestants
(ages stated are at start of contest)

Episode summaries

Episode 1
First aired September 22nd, 2010

100 hopeful girls arrive at Hotel Marriott in Copenhagen. They are thrown into the deep end as they must walk a public catwalk giving it their all.
Afterward, a third of the girls are eliminated. The top 36 then get interviewed by the judging panel, and the number of contestants is lowered to 20 as 16 girls are eliminated.
After a photo shoot with photographer Dennis Stenild, the judging panel decides on the top 13 girls that will compete for the title of Denmark's Next Top Model.

Featured photographer: Dennis Stenild

Episode 2
First aired September 29th, 2010

The girls get their first runway lesson, and fashion expert and mentor Uffe Buchard is extremely disappointed. In the girls' first challenge, they must walk the runway in three different outfits. Rochel exceeds Uffe Buchard's expectations, and becomes the challenge winner, and the owner of a pair of designer shoes.
The girls then feature in a Femme Fatale-inspired photo shoot, where they must pose while walking through rain, and pose for the photographer.

At the panel Serina, Caroline, Brinette and Elise impress the judges, whilst Emma, Sofia and Laila are critiqued by them. Laila's eating habits are criticized by the judges along with her lack of versatility. Sofia's passion is also questioned. The two of them ended up in the bottom two with Sofia being the first girl eliminated.

First call-out: Serina Jensen
Bottom two: Laila McFarlan & Sofia Sakko
Eliminated: Sofia Sakko
Featured photographer: Helle Moosthe 
Guest judges: Helle Moos, Lene Nystrøm
Special guest: Marie Erwolter

Episode 3
First aired October 6th, 2010

The girls got their makeovers, which caused mixed feelings between contestants. While most of the girls felt excited, a few of the girls did not like their new hair. Elise upset Stephanie by telling her that her hair looked like a wig. For this week's challenge the girls had to be in a fashion show for Birger Christensen, a high-profile furrier, where they had to model fur coats while showing off their new looks. Stephanie won the challenge, and a fur stole. For the photo shoot this week, the girls had to pose in a bed with two male models, while wearing nothing but a white shirt and knickers. At judging, most of the girls got praise for their photos, while their attitudes during the makeover were being discussed. While Caroline received praise for being able to pose sexy despite her age, Elise was called out for being mean towards Stephanie. At the end, Serina and Astrid were at the bottom two, Serina for not showing enough passion and lacking in energy, but it was Astrid who was eliminated for being rude at the makeover and always making excuses despite being called on the top 4 last week.

First call-out: Caroline Bader
Bottom two: Astrid Bech Augustinussen & Serina Jensen
Eliminated: Astrid Bech Augustinussen
Featured Photographer: Sean McMenomy
Guest judges: Oliver Bjerrehuus, Sean McMenomy

Episode 4
First aired October 13th, 2010

The girls were in runway lessons, to be taught how to pose at the end of the runway. After the lessons were over, the girls were sent to a lingerie shop for this week's challenge to pose in front of the shop in lingerie. Elise decided not to participate in the challenge for personal reasons. In the end, Brinette won the challenge and got to share the prize with Caroline. At the photoshoot the girls were posing in the midair wearing colorful gowns. At the judging the judges announced that they are going to Paris after the elimination. Brinette, Nanna Jo, and Isabella impress the judges. Elise were praised by the photo but don’t know if she are passionate enough and was noted for not participating in the challenge. She was landed in the bottom two with Serina who was eliminated for her lack of expressions and being forgettable.  despite her first call-out at the first week.
First call-out: Nanna Jo Borgersen
Bottom two: Elise Dubois & Serina Jensen
Eliminated: Serina Jensen
Featured Photographer: Bjarke Johansen
Guest judges: Oliver Bjerrehuus, Tanya Pedersen

Episode 5
First aired October 20th, 2010

The girls flew to Paris and arrived at the hotel at night. The next morning Elise talked openly to the girls about her eating disorder and worried they'd tell the judges about it, but Brinette didn’t believe her. Caroline arrived to the one-on-one session with the girls at the hotel. After that the girls were invited to a cocktail party, but it was actually a secret challenge with three secret judges around in the party. In the end Laila won the challenge and her prize was a years worth of L'Oréal Paris products.

The next day at the photo shoot the girls were shooting beauty shots for L'Oréal Paris. The girls were invited by Caroline in a French restaurant and eating authentic French cuisine. After the dinner party were over, most of the girls celebrated Brinette's Birthday at the nightclub, but Caroline and Stephanie couldn’t because they were underage. At the judging, most of the girls were criticized, Karen changed drastically in front of judges but pulled a bad photo, Stephanie screamed in front the judges to prove that she trying to come out her shell. At the end, Elise’s Stellar Beauty shot earned her first place, while Emma and Rochel were bottom two. Emma for her lack of passion and photographed older in the photo despite her being beautiful in person. Rochel was also criticized for her clothing and for pulling a bad photo, despite her amazing personality. At the end Rochel's personality allowed her to stay in Paris and Emma was sent home to Denmark.
First call-out: Elise Dubois
Bottom two: Emma Penthien & Rochel Rasmusen
Eliminated: Emma Penthien

Episode 6
First aired October 27th, 2010
The girls with and their full luggage were in a fashion lesson with Uffe and a stylist. At the challenge the girls created an outfit in 15 min. At the end Karen was the winner of the challenge and won a Mulberry bag. At the hotel the girls surprised Caroline and celebrated her confirmation party. Caroline's best friend also surprised her in Paris. The girls were in an haut couture shoot on a boat. Karen, Isabella and Rochel were posing alone while the rest of the girls posing in Pairs. While the rest of the girls were shooting, Brinette, Elise and Isabella decided to find the server that Isabella flirted with at the nightclub. At the judging panel, Brinette, Elise and Stephanie impressed the judges while Laila and Isabella were criticized. At the end Isabella and Nanna Jo were in the bottom two, Isabella for her lack of seriousness in the competition, despite her amazing photo in the previous weeks and Nanna Jo’s lack of personality and her slipping performance. At the end Isabella was spared.
First call-out: Stephanie Strarup
Bottom two: Isabella Kaufmann & Nanna Jo Borgersen
Eliminated: Nanna Jo Borgerson

Episode 7
First aired November 3rd, 2010

The girls were back in Denmark and were in an acting lesson at the theater and for this week’s challenge they are Acting Romeo and Juliet with a Male actor. Despite Brinette first attempt didn’t do so well, She was the winner of the challenge and won a trip to spa with a friend (she chose Caroline) and get double the amount of time at photoshoot and get to choose two girls to Clean and cook for the next two days, she chose Rochel and Laila, which the latter cries over that she was chosen to do it. At the photoshoot, the girls are giving two attempts for the mock action posters, but Brinette won this week’s challenge so she’ll get four attempts. The next day at breakfast, Elise was going to bathroom and take Stephanie with her while she was throwing up at the bathroom Stephanie was in the shower  closing her eyes and ears. The girls strongly reacted to the scene, so Jaqueline stepped in and talked to her about her condition. At the judging, before the girls get their critiques, Elise was called forward and the judges decided that Elise will not continue further in competition, so she could get treatment for her condition.
Disqualified: Elise Dubois
The judges continue critique the remaining seven girls. Brinette, Caroline and Karen impressed the judges. And Isabella was provoked by one of the judges who didn’t see her as a model. At the end Isabella and Laila were in the bottom two, Isabella for her bad photo and Laila again for her lack of versatility. At the end Laila was saved, eliminating Isabella. But because of Elise's disqualification earlier, she was allowed to stay in the competition.
First call-out: Brinette Odgaard
Bottom two: Laila McFarlan & Isabella Kaufmann
Originally eliminated: Isabella Kaufmann

Episode 8
First aired November 10th, 2010

The girls were drove to the location to the photo shoot without Karen and Laila, who showed up two hours late. The girls didn't know the photographer was actually an actor and the "photo shoot" was a secret challenge. This week’s challenge was to pose with snakes and spiders in lingerie in a mock photoshoot with an actor as the photographer. Most of girls were impressed especially Isabella who impressed Uffe with her provocativeness in the "photo shoot", Brinette ran away because she was terrified of spiders but got to shoot with the snake instead, and Rochel ran away because she was terrified of snakes but later was given a chance to shoot with a spider instead, she was also given a chance to do with a snake again but refused. At the end of the secret challenge, Stephanie was the winner and won three outfits from Karen Simonsen. At home the girls were playing a parody of the judging panel, except for Laila who was spending time with herself. At the actual photo shoot, the girls were shooting for an Elle Campaign. The girls were surprised that they are going to London, but after the check-in at the airport and waiting at the gate, Caroline showed up and told them that not all of them would fly to London and that there will be an elimination at the airport. At the judging in the airport, Stephanie, Isabella and Caroline impressed by the judges, Karen was criticized for not wearing the right clothing and Laila for showing up late to the challenge. In the end, Stephanie, Caroline and Brinette wrere chosen to be in Elle Campaign. Laila and Rochel landed bottom two Rochel since her personality didn’t shine in the photo and Laila for again show lack of versatility and for being late at the challenge. At the end, Laila was deemed better and got the last ticket to London.
First call-out: Stephanie Strarup
Bottom two: Laila McFarlan & Rochel Rasmusen
Eliminated: Rochel Rasmusen

Episode 9
First aired November 17th, 2010

The girls arrived in London. The next day the arrived to Underwater Studios for their next photo shoot for Georg Jensen Moonlight for a jewelry collection campaign. During the photo shoot, Laila doesn't feel well, and she can't get her injection appointment for B12, and worried about that will cost her place in the competition. In the evening, most of the girls had fun at the nightclub while Caroline and Stephanie stayed at the hotel. The following day at Georg Jensen Jewelry, Caroline gave an announcement that one of the girls will be eliminated right on the spot. Out of the girls, it was Laila who was eliminated for her poor performance at the photo shoot.
Eliminated Outside of Judging Panel: Laila MacFarlen
The remaining five girls are going for their first go-see challenge around London, and the winner will win 50.000 kr worth of jewelry of choice from Georg Jensen Moonlight Collection and an invitation to attend the next fashion awards. Most of the girls couldn't find their way around in London but Brinette, Isabella and Karen arrived on time while Stephanie and Caroline (who was originally the challenge winner) was an hour late and was disqualified from the challenge. All the girls got criticized for inappropriate underwear. Rgardless of this Brinette, was chosen as the challenge winner but she had a choice to keep the prize for herself or share with a friend, she chose the latter option and shared with Caroline. At panel Brinette & Stephanie were praised for a strong photo. Isabella's photo was good. Karen was criticized, for not showing confidence in person and the photo. And Caroline was criticized for her bad photo. At call-out Brinette got the best photo and won Georg Jensen Moonlight Campaign. Caroline and Isabella landed in the bottom two. Caroline for showing up late at the go-sees and a bad photo and Isabella for her lacking focus and learn to take care of herself. It was Caroline’s Strong portfolio and potential that got her to the final 4.
First call-out: Brinette Odgaard
Bottom two: Caroline Bader & Isabella Kaufmann
Eliminated: Isabella Kaufmann

Episode 10
First aired November 23rd, 2010

Eliminated: Karen Ziefeldt & Stephanie Strarup
Final two: Brinette Odgaard & Caroline Bader
Denmark's Next Top Model: Caroline Bader

Summaries

Call-out order

 The contestant was eliminated
 The contestant was disqualified from the competition
 The contestant was the original eliminee but was saved
 The contestant was eliminated outside of judging panel
 The contestant won the competition

In Episode 1, the pool of 20 girls was reduced to the final 13 who would move on to the main competition. This first call-out does not reflect their performance.
In Episode 7, Elise was disqualified before the call-out because the judges suspected her of suffering from bulimia. Had it not been for that, Isabella would have been eliminated.
In Episode 9, Laila was eliminated outside of the judging panel.
In Episode 10, the girls were called individually and in no particular order to face their verdict.

Photo shoot guide
Episode 1 photo shoot: Casting photos
Episode 2 photo shoot: Femme fatales
Episode 3 photo shoot: Sexual chemistry with a pair of male models
Episode 4 photo shoot: Suspended in the air wearing colorful gowns
Episode 5 photo shoot: Glamorous and edgy beauty shots
Episode 6 photo shoot: Parisian couture in pairs
Episode 7 photo shoot: Action movie posters
Episode 8 photo shoot: Elle campaign
Episode 9 photo shoot: Underwater jewelry for Georg Jensen
Episode 10 commercial & photo shoot: Egekilde water bottle; B&W nude with accessories

Post–Topmodel careers

Sofia Sakko has appeared on the cover and editorials for Z! Magazine Zambia, taken a couple of test shots and shooting print work for Karoline Thomsen, Moi Aziza, Ballerup Centret,... She has also walked in fashion shows for Thomas Gerdes' graduation collection during Fashion Design Akademiet 2011, Camilla Karm during Copenhagen Fashion Week 2016, for shows during African Trends in the African Fashion Show 2019 such as Iccp Style César, Nordic Afro Design, Boatemaa Wiredu,...
Astrid Bech Augustinussen signed with Unique Models. She has taken a couple of test shots and modeled for La Maison Justian Kunz. She retired from modeling in 2015.
Serina Jensen signed with Unique Models, Two Management, First Model Management in London, Fashion Model Management in Milan, Chadwick Models in Sydney, Pars Management in Munich and D Model Agency in Athens. She appeared on an editorials for Femina, Girlscape magazine, LaMode magazine, Elegant magazine, Minc magazine, Spook magazine,... She has also walked in fashion shows for Stine Goya spring-summer 2012, By Malene Birger February 2013, MI-NO-RO during Copenhagen Fashion Week 2014, Alannah Hill during Australian Fashion Week 2014, Stasia-Lace By Stasia, Jesper Høvring, Nicholas Nybro,... Jensen has modeled and shooting campaigns for Sisters Point, By Malene Birger, Teamm8 Australia, Ell & Cee Bride, Pfeiffer The Label, Y.A.S Apparel SS16, Sandstone Scandinavia, Dea Kubidal, Denim Hunter, BeautyBear Vitamins, Marimekko,...
Emma Penthien signed with Heartbreak Management in Oslo. She has taken a couple of test shots, modeled for Baserange AW12 collection and walked in fashion show for Rikke Hubert AW13. Beside modeling, she appeared in the music videos "Be My Love" by I'm All Ears. She retired from modeling in 2016.
Nanna Jo Borgersen has been modeled for Stig P. She retired from modeling in 2013.
Elise Lou Dubois signed with Unique Models, Le Management, Brave Models in Milan, Model Management in Hamburg, Touché Models in Amsterdam, Models 1 Agency in London, Ice Model Management in Cape Town, Next Company Modelagency in Vienna and Dulcedo Models in Toronto. She appeared on the cover and editorials of Alt for Damerne #40 October 2011, Woman magazine, Treats! magazine, Elle Denmark February 2013, Glamour South Africa,... She has modeled and shooting campaigns for Buffalo David Bitton, Equip Samara,... Dubois has also walked in fashion shows for several designers during Copenhagen Fashion Week such as Benedikte Utzon, Margit Brandt, Malene Birger SS12, CPH Vision/Terminal 2 Press Shows SS12, Designskolen Kolding SS12, Guldknappen SS12, Margit Brandt AW11, Stine Goya SS12, Rützou AW11, Wackerhaus SS12,... She retired from modeling in 2015.
Rochel Rasmusen signed with Basic Pro Models, 20 Model Management in Cape Town, Gold Models in Beau Bassin-Rose Hill, The Identity Models in New York City and Faze Models in Berlin. She has also walked in fashion shows for Thomas Gerdes' graduation collection during Fashion Design Akademiet 2011, Jesper Høvring during Copenhagen Fashion Week 2017, Gudrun Sjödén, Nicholas Nybro,... She appeared on the cover and editorials for Cover magazine, Sport magazine #433 January 2016, Faces magazine October 2017, Positive magazine #11, Cultured magazine, Taji Mag,... Rasmusen has modeled and shooting campaigns for DYRBERG/KERN, Elsa Adams Couture, One Two & Luxzuz, Burkinabaé Enterprises, Amazonic-fit, Dressmeup.dk, Vitra Société, Studio 51 Secondhand&Vintage, Dedicated. Brand,...
Laila McFarlan signed with INQ Models and Models 1 Agency in London. She has taken a couple of test shots and appeared on an editorials of Echos Coiffure May-June 2012. She has modeled and shooting campaigns for D'Aniello, Hair Envy - Extensions Clinique, Primavera-Verano 2013, The Last Conspiracy,... She retired from modeling in 2015.
Isabella Kaufmann has been work as an alternative model before retired from modeling in 2016.
Karen Ziefeldt signed with 1st Option Model Management, Étoile Models, Visage Models in Buenos Aires, Ace Models in Athens, Faze Models in Berlin and 20 Model Management in Cape Town. She appeared on an editorials for GO Beauty magazine, Fit Living,... and has also walked in fashion shows for Jesper Høvring during Copenhagen Fashion Week 2017, Gudrun Sjödén,... She has modeled and shooting campaigns for Miinto, Primavera-Verano 2012/13, Friis & Co., Raha Asadi, Les Rêves lingerie, Jane Iredale Danmark, Mai Jacobsen, MessyWeekend sunglasses, Cero & Etage, Kaffe Clothing, Thirdhand Vintage, Rodeo Frisørkæde, Pure Lime Sport, Marc Lauge, Signal Clothing, Loow Women,...
Stephanie Strarup signed with Unique Models and Étoile Models. She has taken a couple of test shots and walked in fashion shows for several designers during Copenhagen Fashion Week.
Brinette Odgaard signed with Unique Models and Le Management. She has taken a couple of test shots and appeared on the cover and editorials of Bast magazine #8, Appetize magazine #6, Skøn magazine #37 December 2013, DFDS Fashion & Lifestyle magazine autumn-winter 2017,... She has modeled and shooting campaigns for nOva Bags & accessories, Rebekka Notkin Jewellery, Arne Jacobsen watches,... Odgaard has also walked in fashion shows for several designers during Copenhagen Fashion Week. She has also been feature on a book called 100 Great Danes – A Tribute to Women! by Bjarke Johansen & Simon Rasmussen's. She retired from modeling in 2018.
Caroline Bader has collected her prizes though has since ended her representation with Unique Models and switched to Le Management in Copenhagen. She appeared on the cover and editorials of Elle Denmark December 2010, Jegelskermode.dk website, Skøn magazine, Costume magazine,... She has modeled and shooting campaigns for L'Oreal, Margit Brandt, Vero Moda, Nicci Welsh, Nivea,... She has also walked in fashion shows for several designers during Copenhagen Fashion Week 2010. Bader retired from modeling in 2020.

References

Danmarks Næste Topmodel
2010 Danish television seasons